
Key works of  are those Illuminated manuscripts of the Carolingian period which are recognised in art historical scholarship as works of particular artistic significance (especially those included in general overviews).

The first work to be considered Carolingian is the Godescalc Evangelistary, which was created for Charlemagne between 781 and 783. Until this point, Merovingian and Insular illumination had continued without a breach. The developers of Carolingian illumination were the so-called "court school of Charlemagne" at the Palace of Aachen, which created the manuscripts of the "." Contemporary was the "Palace School" which was probably based in the same place, but whose artists were from Byzantium or Byzantine Italy. The codices of this school are also known as the "group of the Vienna Coronation Gospels" after their most outstanding examples. After the death of Charlemagne, the centre of illumination shifted to Rheims, Tours and Metz. Since the Court School dominated in the time of Charlemagne, it was more influential in later times than the works of the Palace School. The high point of Carolingian illumination came to an end in the late ninth century. In late Carolingian times a  developed which incorporated forms from insular illumination, before a new epoch began at the end of the tenth century with the development of

List of manuscripts

References

Bibliography 

 Florentine Mütherich, Joachim E. Gaehde: Karolingische Buchmalerei. Prestel, München 1979. 
 Hermann Fillitz: "Propyläen–Kunstgeschichte," Vol 5: Das Mittelalter 1. Propyläen–Verlag, Berlin 1990. 
 Hans Holländer: "Die Entstehung Europas," in: Belser Stilgeschichte, Studienausgabe, Vol 2, edited by Christoph Wetzel, pp. 153–384. Belser, Stuttgart 1993 [on illumination pp. 241–255]
 Christoph Stiegemann, Matthias Wemhoff: 799. Kunst und Kultur der Karolingerzeit. Katalog der Ausstellung Paderborn 1999, Verlag Philipp von Zabern, Mainz 1999. 
 Kunibert Bering: Kunst des frühen Mittelalters (Kunst–Epochen, Vol. 2). Reclam, Stuttgart 2002. 
 Ingo F. Walther, Norbert Wolf: Meisterwerke der Buchmalerei. Taschen, Köln. 2005, 
 Peter van den Brink, Sarvenaz Ayooghi (Hrsg.): Karl der Große – Charlemagne. Karls Kunst. Katalog der Sonderausstellung Karls Kunst vom 20. Juni bis 21. September 2014 im Centre Charlemagne, Aachen. Sandstein, Dresden 2014,  (on illumination passim).

Arts-related lists